The Treaty Tree (Afrikaans: Verdragboom or Traktaatboom ) is a 500-year-old white milkwood tree on Treaty Road  and south of the rail line in Woodstock, Cape Town, South Africa. Peace  was made under the tree on 10 January 1806 after the Battle of Blaauwberg, thereby starting the second British occupation of the Cape and leading to the permanent establishment of the Cape Colony as a British possession. Until 1834 slaves were sold and convicts hanged under it.

Prior to the arrival of the Dutch, the tree was known to have been a feature of the local landscape since at least the early 1500s. In 1509 a massacre by Khoikhoi of 64 Portuguese sailors under the command of Dom Francisco de Almeida took place close to the tree.

Protection
The City of Cape Town owns the property, and the tree was declared a monument in 1967.

See also
 Post Office Tree in Mosselbay – one of several other South African white milkwood trees that have been declared monuments
 List of individual trees

References

Bibliography 
 Green, Lawrence G.: I heard the old men say. Kaapstad: Howard Timmins, 1964.
 Oberholster, J.J.: Die historiese monumente van Suid-Afrika. Kaapstad: Kultuurstigting Rembrandt van Rijn vir die Raad vir Nasionale Gedenkwaardighede, 1972.

External links

History of Cape Town
Monuments and memorials in South Africa
Individual trees in South Africa